Bilara Tehsil is a tehsil in Jodhpur District of Rajasthan state in western India. The tehsil headquarters are in the town of Bilara.

Geography
Bilara tehsil is the southeasternmost of the eleven tehsils in Jodhpur District.  It borders Bhopalgarh tehsil to the north, Nagaur District to the northeast, Pali District to the east and south, and Luni tehsil and Mandor tehsil to the west.

History

Bilara tehsil was part of the SOHU princely state of Marwar.

Economy
The economy of the tehsil is mainly based on agriculture and related businesses.

Demographics
In the 2001 census, the Bilara tehsil had 251,946 inhabitants, with 130,451 males (51.8%) and 121,495 females (48.2%), for a gender ratio of 931 females per thousand males. In 2001, the tehsil was 71.7% rural.

Points of interest
The Marwari people inhabit most of Bilara tehsil, and one can see typical Marwari customs and culture in the town of Bilara, and in villages throughout the tehsil.

Villages
There are forty panchayat villages in Bilara tehsil:

Bala
Barna
Bhawi
Binjwadia
Borunda
Boyal
Buchkalla
Chandelao
Chirdhani
Choda
Ghana Magra or Ghana Mangra
Hariyada
Hariyadhana

Jetiwas
Jhak
Kalauna
Kaparda
Khariya Mithapur
Khejarla
Lamba
Madaliya
Malawas
Malkosani
Nanan
Olvi
Patel Nagar

Pichiyak
Ramasani
Ramdawas
Ransi gaon
Rawniyana
Rawar
Rinya
Sambariya
Silari
Sindhipuri
Tilwasni
Udaliyawas

Notes

Tehsils of Rajasthan
Jodhpur district